A list of films produced in Hong Kong in 1982:

References

External links
 IMDB list of Hong Kong films
 Hong Kong films of 1982 at HKcinemamagic.com

1982
Lists of 1982 films by country or language
1982 in Hong Kong